Sericocarpus is a genus of North American plants in the tribe Astereae within the family Asteraceae. Whitetop aster is a common name for the genus.

 Species
 Sericocarpus asteroides - United States (MS AL GA FL SC NC TN KY WV VA MD DE NJ PA OH MI NY CT MA RI VT NH ME)
 Sericocarpus linifolius - United States (LA MS AL GA SC NC TN KY WV VA MD DE NJ PA OH IN MI NY CT MA RI NH)
 Sericocarpus oregonensis  United States (CA OR WA)
 Sericocarpus rigidus - Canada (BC), United States (WA OR)
 Sericocarpus tortifolius - United States (LA MS AL GA FL SC NC)

 formerly included
see Eucephalus
 Sericocarpus tomentellus - Eucephalus tomentellus

References

Astereae
Flora of North America
Asteraceae genera
Taxa named by Christian Gottfried Daniel Nees von Esenbeck